Eschbach is a municipality in the Südliche Weinstraße district, in Rhineland-Palatinate, Germany.

References

Palatinate Forest
Südliche Weinstraße